Clefs is a former commune in the Maine-et-Loire department in western France. In January 2013 it merged with Vaulandry to form the commune of Clefs-Val d'Anjou, which merged into the commune Baugé-en-Anjou on 1 January 2016. Its population was 950 in 2019.

See also
Communes of the Maine-et-Loire department

References

Former communes of Maine-et-Loire